UO may stand for:

Arts and entertainment
 Call of Duty: United Offensive, an expansion pack for the popular first-person shooter computer game, Call of Duty
 Ultima Online, a graphical massively multiplayer online role-playing game
 Underoath, an American Christian metalcore band from Tampa, Florida
 Urge Overkill, an alternative rock band, formed in Chicago, United States

Businesses and organizations

Businesses
 Universal Orlando, a theme park resort in Orlando, Florida
 Urban Outfitters, a publicly traded American company
 Hong Kong Express Airways (IATA code: UO), an airline based in Hong Kong

Universities
 University of Okara, a public, coeducational university in Okara, Punjab, Pakistan
 University of Oregon, a public, coeducational research university in Eugene, Oregon, USA
 University of Osnabrück, public, coeducational university in Osnabrück, Lower Saxony, Germany
 University of Otago, a public, coeducational university in Dunedin, New Zealand
 University of Oradea, a public, coeducational university in Oradea, Romania
 University of Ottawa, a public, coeducational university in Canada
 University of Oxford, a public, coeducational university in United Kingdom

Other organizations
 Orthodox Union, a kosher certification service which places a "U inside O" logo on food packaging

Other uses
 Unexploded ordnance, explosive weapons that did not explode when they were employed 
 Urate oxidase, an enzyme that catalyzes the oxidation of uric acid to 5-hydroxyisourate

See also
 U of O (disambiguation)